Lancelot Stephen Bosanquet (26 December 1903  St. Stephen's-by-Saltash, Cornwall, England – 10 January 1984 Cambridge) was a British mathematician who worked in analysis, especially Fourier series.

His daughter, Rosamund Caroline Bosanquet (1940-2013) was a British cellist, music teacher and composer.

References

People from Saltash
1903 births
1984 deaths
20th-century English mathematicians
Scientists from Cornwall